The Timor-Leste Ministry of Finance (MOF;) is the government department of East Timor accountable for the government budget and public finances.

Functions
The Ministry is responsible for the design, implementation, coordination and evaluation of policy for:

 annual planning; and
 monitoring 
of the government budget and public finances.

Minister
The incumbent Minister of Finance is Rui Augusto Gomes.

See also 
 List of finance ministries
 Politics of East Timor

References

Footnote

Notes

External links

  – official site 

Finance
East Timor
East Timor, Finance
1975 establishments in East Timor